Seize quartiers is a French phrase which literally means a person's "sixteen quarters", the coats of arms of their sixteen great-great-grandparents quarters of nobility, which are typically accompanied by a five generation genealogy  ahnentafel outlining the relationship between them and their descendant. They were used as a proof of nobility ("the proof of the Seize Quartiers") in part of Continental Europe beginning in the seventeenth century and achieving their highest prominence in the eighteenth. In other parts, like in France, antiquity of the male line was preferred. Possession of seize-quartiers guaranteed admission to any court in Europe, and bestowed many advantages. For example, Frederick the Great was known to make a study of the seize quartiers of his courtiers. They were less common in the British Isles, seventeenth-century Scottish examples being the most prevalent. 

According to Arthur Charles Fox-Davies in 1909, there were very few valid examples of seize quartiers among British families outside a small group of "Roman Catholic aristocracy", and after diligent searching, he could only find two Britons who were entitled to Trente Deux Quartiers (five generations of ancestors who were all armigerous). 

Some held the view that, once a family had achieved seize-quartiers, descendants in the male line would continue to be entitled to the benefits even if they continually married non-armigerous women. Their use is now generally limited to genealogical, heraldic, and antiquarian circles.

See also
Genealogical numbering systems
Quarters of nobility

References

Heraldry
Genealogy